Sineidisi (Greek: Συνείδηση; English: Consciousness) is the second studio album by Greek singer Dimitris Kokotas. It was released in Greece in 1995 by EROS Music. It reached 1× platinum status. This is the second collaboration of Dimitris Kokotas with songwriter Phoebus.

Track listing
 "Liono" - 4:58
 "Giati me tyrannas" - 3:58
 "Poli kali gia na sai alithini" - 4:26
 "Ki ase na lene" - 4:50
 "S'ena tilefonima" - 3:32
 "Sineidisi" - 3:54
 "Anemona" - 4:39
 "Poso mou leipsan" - 3:53
 "M'anisiheis" - 3:37
 "Kathe fora pou me ksehnas" - 4:18

All the lyrics and music: Phoebus

Credits and personnel 

Personnel
Phoebus- Music, Lyrics, orchestration, programming
Giorgos Roilos-Percussion
Giannis Bithikotsis- baglama, bouzouki, tzoura, mandolino
Antonis Gounaris- Guitars, cumbus
Maria Reboutsika-violin
Dimitris Kokotas-vocals, second vocals, background vocals
Odysseas Korelis-violin
Ploutarhos Reboutsikas-cello
Dimitris Zouboulis-violin
Eva Tselidou, Vanessa Karageorgou-background vocals
Nikos Chatzopoulos-violin

Production
Phoebus- producer
Panagiotis Petronikolos - sound, mixing
Vaggelis Papadopoulos, Antonis Papathanasiou - sound

Credits adapted from the album's liner notes.

References

1995 albums
Greek-language albums